Independencia is one of the 21 municipalities (municipios) that makes up the Venezuelan state of Miranda and, according to a 2007 population estimate by the National Institute of Statistics of Venezuela, the municipality has a population of 160,899. The town of Santa Teresa del Tuy is the municipal seat of the Independencia Municipality.

Demographics
The Independencia Municipality, according to a 2007 population estimate by the National Institute of Statistics of Venezuela, has a population of 160,899 (up from 137,469 in 2000). This amounts to 5.6% of the state's population.

Government
The mayor of the Independencia Municipality is Wilmer Salazar, re-elected on October 31, 2004, with 50% of the vote. The municipality is divided into two parishes; Santa Teresa del Tuy and El Cartanal.

References

Municipalities of Miranda (state)